Amphisbaena kraoh is a species of worm lizards found in Brazil.

References

kraoh
Reptiles described in 1971
Endemic fauna of Brazil
Reptiles of Brazil
Taxa named by Paulo Vanzolini